Nothofagus nitida (Chiloé's coigue) is an evergreen tree, native to southern Chile and Argentina. It is found from latitude 40° S to Última Esperanza (53° S).

Description
Up to 35 m (115 ft) height and 2 m (6.5 ft) diameter. The bark is gray. It prefers very wet soils.

Leaves are alternate between 1.5 and 3 cm, they are hard, glossy green, with a small petiole and lanceolate shape. The new borne twigs have little hairs.

Male flowers have a unique verticil with 6–10 stamens and are surrounded by tepals (sepals and petals just the same). Female flowers are grouped five by five, and pollination is mainly anemophilous. The flowers are homochlamyd, small (3 to 5 mm), unisexual, arranged in inflorescences.

Its fruits are small, flattened or triangular, yellowish in cupules made up by 2 to 7 units.

Uses
The wood is white-yellowish colored. It has beautiful engraving and it is used in furniture and construction.

References

Donoso, Claudio. 2005. Árboles nativos de Chile. Guía de reconocimiento. Valdivia, Chile
Hoffmann, Adriana, 1998. Flora Silvestre de Chile. Fundación Claudio Gay. Santiago.

External links
Encyclopedia of Chilean Flora: Nothofagus nitida
ChileBosque - Nothofagus nitida
chlorischile: Nothofagus nitida

Nothofagaceae
Flora of southern Chile
Flora of South Argentina
Trees of mild maritime climate
Trees of subpolar oceanic climate